The Life Ahead is a 2020 Italian drama film directed by Edoardo Ponti, from a screenplay by Ponti and Ugo Chiti. It is the third screen adaptation of the 1975 novel The Life Before Us by Romain Gary. It stars Sophia Loren, Ibrahima Gueye and Abril Zamora, and is set in Bari, Italy.

The film was preceded by Madame Rosa, a 1977 film based on the Gary novel, directed by Moshé Mizrahi and featuring Simone Signoret. Like the book, the first film version is set in Paris.

The Life Ahead was given a limited release on November 6, 2020, followed by digital streaming on Netflix on November 13, 2020.

Plot
Madam Rosa is a former prostitute and Jewish Holocaust survivor who provides a home in her apartment for the children of other "working women" in the port city of Bari, Apulia, Italy. After Momo, a 12-year-old, orphaned, Senegalese immigrant, robs her, Dr. Coen, the boy's foster guardian, who also happens to be Rosa's doctor, brings her stolen items back and makes the boy apologize. Coen offers Rosa money to take in the boy and look after him for a couple of months, and she reluctantly agrees.

Momo, who has been kicked out of school for stabbing a bully with a pencil, secretly sells drugs for a dealer in Bari, but Rosa also finds him work with Hamil, a kind Muslim shopkeeper. All of these adults try to guide the boy. Rosa's neighbor and friend Lola, a transgender prostitute, whose daughter Rosa looks after, helps Rosa as she begins to decline mentally. At times she is lucid while at others she is catatonic.

Rosa and Momo develop a deep bond, and after he becomes her only ward, he quits selling drugs. Although her health is declining, Rosa asks Momo to promise to keep her out of hospitals, of which she is terrified since being medically experimented as a child in the Auschwitz concentration camp. Momo agrees and promises, but Rosa is finally taken to the hospital after a particularly bad episode. Momo sneaks her out of the hospital at night and hides her in a basement storage room in her apartment building, where she feels safe. Momo stays there with Rosa, caring for her until she dies. Afterwards, Lola finally discovers their secret. The film ends with Rosa's funeral.

Cast
 Sophia Loren as Madame Rosa
 Ibrahim Gueye as Momo
 Abril Zamora as Lola
 Renato Carpentieri as Dr. Coen
 Babak Karimi as Hamil
 Massimiliano Rossi as drug dealer

Production
In July 2019, it was announced that Sophia Loren, Ibrahaim Gueye, Abril Zamora, Renato Carpentieri and Babak Karimi had joined the cast of the film, with Edoardo Ponti directing from a screenplay he wrote alongside Ugo Chiti, based upon the novel The Life Before Us by Romain Gary.

Principal photography began in July 2019 in Bari, Italy.

Release
In February 2020, Netflix acquired worldwide distribution rights to the film. It was released in a limited release on November 6, 2020, followed by digital streaming on Netflix on November 13, 2020.

According to Deadline, The Life Ahead became a streaming hit, peaking within Netflix's top ten in 37 countries.

Critical reception
The site's critical consensus reads: "A classic example of how a talented actor can elevate somewhat standard material, The Life Ahead proves Sophia Loren's star power remains absolutely undimmed." On Metacritic, the film holds a rating of 66 out of 100, based on 24 critics, indicating "generally favorable reviews".

In a three-starred review for The Observer, Mark Kermode said of Sophia Loren: "The 86-year-old star’s expressive performance as a former sex worker caring for an orphaned child is the main draw in this sometimes formulaic tale directed by her son." P.J. Grisar of The Forward was critical in his review, calling the film "treacly," "derivative," and "clichéd" when compared with the 1977 film Madame Rosa, its "nuanced and celebrated predecessor." He calls Loren's performance "sturdy" and Ponti’s direction "capable," but describes The Life Ahead as a "wan exercise, free of humor or verve."

Accolades

References

External links
 
 
 
 

2020 drama films
2020 films
American drama films
Films based on French novels
Films based on works by Romain Gary
Italian drama films
Italian-language Netflix original films
Italian remakes of French films
2020s American films
2020s Italian films